is a Japanese professional baseball pitcher for the Orix Buffaloes in Japan's Nippon Professional Baseball.

External links

NPB.com

1989 births
Living people
People from Kashihara, Nara
Baseball people from Nara Prefecture
Nihon University alumni
Nippon Professional Baseball pitchers
Orix Buffaloes players
Indios de Mayagüez players
Japanese expatriate baseball players in Puerto Rico